Sigmoidocele (also known as Pouch of Douglas descent) refers to a condition where the sigmoid colon descends (prolapses) into the lower pelvic cavity.   This can obstruct the rectum and cause symptoms of obstructed defecation.

Pathophysiology

The phenomenon is caused by a weak section of  fascial supports of the vagina (the uterosacral cardinal ligament
complex and rectal vaginal septum), which allows a section of peritoneum containing the sigmoid colon to prolapse out of normal position and fall between the rectum and the vagina.

Diagnosis
It is not possible to differentiate between a rectocele and a sigmoidocele on vaginal examination.  Defecating proctography will demonstrate a sigmoidocele during straining.

Epidemiology

Sigmoidocele normally occurs in females, and is uncommon.

References

Noninflammatory disorders of female genital tract
Colorectal surgery
Gynaecology